Erisdorf is a small village in Upper Suebia (South Württemberg, Germany), about 3 km north of the main community Ertingen, in the direction of Riedlingen.

Description
The population of 449 (2009) live on a village area of about 5.27 km² at an altitude of 560 to 580 m above sea level.

History
In 1311, Erisdorf was mentioned first on the occasion of the sale of the lands of Lord Henry, called "Flekle", a knight, to the Salem monastery. In the sales documents its name was rendered as "Eringsdorf".

In 1403, the Abbey of Reichenau gave new tenures to it. Until the rule of Württemberg in 1805 the Riedlingen Hospice or its curator, the mayor and council of the town, had the jurisdiction, elected the head of the council, and chose the 12 lawyers from the village.

Parochially, however, Erisdorf was part of Ertingen. An early mass has been held since 1403, but it was not until 1837 that it became an independent parish.

Folklore
Erisdorf takes also part in reanimating the Suebian traditions of "Fasnet". The Erisdorf type of carnival is marked by the colourful rites and ceremonies of the "Röthenbächler". Their costumes are blue and remind of the professional habit of millers in the 16th century. The name is taken from the stream in Erisdorf which once powered the village mill.

One of the traditional festivals in Erisdorf, attracting a great number of visitors from surrounding villages, is the so-called "festival of the noodles" ("Nudlafescht"), where home-made noodles ranging from plain noodles over "Spätzle" to the "cigar noodles" reminding of cigars in shape and with a sweet taste.

External links
 https://web.archive.org/web/20190908034142/https://www.ertingen.de/
 http://www.erisdorf.de/
 http://www.feuerwehr-erisdorf.de/

Towns in Baden-Württemberg